KFYN (1420 AM, "Rewind 103.9") is an American radio station broadcasting a classic hits format. Licensed  to Bonham, Texas, United States, serving the Texoma area. KFYN's studios were located in downtown Paris. KFYN is currently owned by Vision Media Group, Inc.,

History
The station first began broadcasting as KFYN on AM 1420 on May 20, 1948 as a daytime-only station with 250 watts.

KFYN started adding classic country into its Top 40 Country rotation in December 2013 until it ultimately became fully Classic Country in January 2014.

In April 2016, KFYN added an FM translator simulcast on 95.7 FM. At the same time, the Classic Country format was updated to a mix of 70s Outlaw Country and Classic Red Dirt in addition to the regular 60s/70s Country Gold.

In late July 2016, KFYN flipped to a classic country format, shifting its focus to 80s/90s hot country hits while rebranding to "Kickin' Country".

On September 1, 2021, at 12 PM, KFYN completed the move of its FM translator to 103.9 FM while simultaneously changing to a classic hits format as "Rewind 103.9".

References

External links
Rewind 103.9 Facebook
Official Website

FYN (AM)
Radio stations established in 1947
1947 establishments in Texas
Classic hits radio stations in the United States